Bernard Cathelin (20 May 1919 – 17 April 2004) was a French painter born in Paris and a member of the School of Paris which included Picasso, Chagall, Matisse, Dufy and many others including Maurice Brianchon, Cathelin's teacher at the Ecole Nationale Supérieure des Arts Décoratifs. Although he received critical acclaim as early as 1950, Cathelin was not able to live solely from his painting until 1955. Since that time Cathelin has received steadily increasing recognition and has been featured in over 50 exhibitions worldwide. Throughout his life, he maintained a deep-rooted love for his country and especially for the Drôme, where his mother came from.

Famous for oil paintings and lithographs with a richness of texture and vivid colour, the three favorite themes in Cathelin's work are still life, landscapes and portraits of women. Cathelin has traveled extensively around the world. Countries such as Mexico, Russia, Japan, Italy and Spain were a source of inspiration for his creations: and ever the landscapes of the Drôme in and neighbouring Provence where he found his roots.

Elected to the Legion of Honour by the French President of the Republic, François Mitterrand in 1995, the Musée de Valence dedicated him a retrospective of his work in the summer of 1997. This exhibition, by drawing local and worldwide visitors, established a new attendance record for the museum.

In 2000, the Shanghai Art Museum in China organised a retrospective exhibition presenting 40 years of Bernard Cathelin's works.

Bernard Cathelin died on 17 April 2004, but exhibitions are often dedicated to him in France and across the world.

Biography

References
 Pascal Bonafoux, Cathelin, 2000 Editions Ides et Calendes, Neuchâtel (Suisse) .

External links 
 https://web.archive.org/web/20121118064433/http://www.buschlenmowatt.com/artists/bernard-cathelin
 https://web.archive.org/web/20150416100736/http://www.museedevalence.fr/fr/cathelin-comme-jamais
 http://www.montelimar.fr/reportages.php?galerie=56&them=4#reportage
 http://www.galeriesapet.fr/Cathelin/Cathelin.htm
 http://culturebox.francetvinfo.fr/expositions/peinture/grand-succes-pour-la-retrospective-cathelin-a-montelimar-66199
 http://culturebox.francetvinfo.fr/visite-inedite-de-latelier-du-peintre-bernard-cathelin-dans-la-drome-15025
 http://www.galerie-yoshii.com/profile.php?p=b_cathelin
 http://www.etudesdromoises.com/pages/pages_revue/resumes_d_articles/cathelin.htm 

1919 births
2004 deaths
Painters from Paris
20th-century French painters
20th-century French male artists
French male painters
21st-century French painters
21st-century French male artists